Dr. Russell Cowley (born August 12, 1983) is a Canadian-born British professional ice hockey player currently playing for the Swindon Wildcats. He plays either as a forward or more recently as a defenceman.

Playing career 

Cowley started his career at Swindon Phoenix in 2000 before joining Coventry Blaze in the BNL in 2001. He stayed with the Blaze as they progressed into the EIHL, and was part of the team that won the Grand Slam (league, challenge cup & playoffs) in 2004–05. He signed for rivals Cardiff Devils in 2006 but returned to Coventry the following season, helping the Blaze to another two league titles in 2008 and 2010.

Cowley played for the England under-18 and under-20 teams in his junior international career, and played on the Great Britain men's national ice hockey team.

Although Cowley usually plays as a forward, he has played a number of games on defence for Coventry over recent seasons and was signed as a full-time defenceman for the 2011/12 season.

In March 2017, Cowley announced his intention to retire.

Despite his retirement announcement, Cowley played for the Basingstoke Bison in the NIHL in the 2018-19 season - a tier below the EIHL, a league in which Cowley had played in for most of his career.
A year later, Cowley signed for the Milton Keynes Lightning, whom had recently entered the reformatted NIHL.

Career statistics

Regular season & playoffs

International

References

External links 

1983 births
Canadian ice hockey defencemen
Canadian ice hockey forwards
English ice hockey defencemen
English ice hockey forwards
Canadian emigrants to England
Cardiff Devils players
Coventry Blaze players
Basingstoke Bison players
Milton Keynes Lightning players
Living people
Ice hockey people from Edmonton
Swindon Wildcats players